The Damage Done is a book by Australian Warren Fellows. It portrays his time in the notorious Bangkwang prison, nicknamed "Big Tiger". Fellows was sentenced to life imprisonment in 1978, convicted of heroin trafficking between Bangkok, Thailand and Australia.

Australian non-fiction books
Memoirs of imprisonment
Macmillan Publishers books
1997 non-fiction books